The Science Advisor to the President is an individual charged with providing advisory opinions and analysis on science and technology matters to the President of the United States. The first Science Advisor, Vannevar Bush, chairman of the Office of Scientific Research and Development, served Presidents Franklin Delano Roosevelt and Harry S. Truman from 1941 to 1951. President Truman created the President's Science Advisory Committee in 1951, establishing the chairman of this committee as the President's Science Advisor. This committee continued under Presidents Dwight D. Eisenhower, John F. Kennedy, Lyndon B. Johnson, and Richard M. Nixon until 1973. Nixon terminated the committee rather than appointing a replacement for his advisor who had resigned. The US Congress established the Office of Science and Technology Policy in 1976, re-establishing Presidential Science Advisors to the present day.

The current advisor is Arati Prabhakar, who has served as the 12th director of the White House Office of Science and Technology Policy (OSTP) since October 3, 2022.

History

Special Advisory Board
Although the National Research Council (now known as the National Academies of Sciences, Engineering, and Medicine), formed in 1916, was the first body formed to advise the government on science and technology, President Franklin Delano Roosevelt launched the Science Advisory Board as a body within the NRC in 1933 in order to advise the president. Karl Taylor Compton served as the chair of the body. However, the body was dissolved in 1935.

World War II

The OSTP evolved out of the Office of Scientific Research and Development created in 1941 during World War II by Roosevelt. Vannevar Bush chaired this office through Roosevelt's death in 1945, and continued under Roosevelt's successor Harry S. Truman until 1951.

PSAC

After the war, President Harry S. Truman replaced the OSRD with the Science Advisory Committee in 1951. The office was moved to the White House on November 21, 1957, by President Dwight D. Eisenhower to provide advice and recommendation in response to the  Space Race started by the USSR's launch of the first artificial Earth satellite, Sputnik 1.

OSTP

President Richard M. Nixon eliminated the PSAC in 1973, rather than appointing a replacement for his second Science Advisor, Edward E. David Jr., who resigned. The United States Congress established the OSTP in 1976 with a broad mandate to advise the President and others within the Executive Office of the President on the effects of science and technology on domestic and international affairs. The 1976 Act also authorizes OSTP to lead inter-agency efforts to develop and to implement sound science and technology policies and budgets and to work with the private sector, state and local governments, the science and higher education communities, and other nations toward this end.

Science Advisors

See also 
 Chief Technology Officer of the United States

References 

Executive Office of the President of the United States
United States